The Jenkins-Harvey Super Service Station and Garage, at 124 S. College in Tyler, Texas, was built in 1929.  It was listed on the National Register of Historic Places in 2002.

It was designed by James P. Baugh in Art Deco style and is a landmark in Tyler.

See also

National Register of Historic Places listings in Smith County, Texas

References

National Register of Historic Places in Smith County, Texas
Gas stations on the National Register of Historic Places in Texas
Art Deco architecture in Texas
Buildings and structures completed in 1929